The 2015 season is Mjøndalen's 105th season, and their first Tippeligaen season for 22 years. It is their 10th season with Vegard Hansen as manager, during which they will compete in the Norwegian Cup as well as the Tippeligaen.

Squad

Transfers

Winter

In:

Out:

Summer

In:

Out:

Competitions

Tippeligaen

Results summary

Results by round

Results

Table

Norwegian Cup

Squad statistics

Appearances and goals

|-
|colspan="14"|Players away from Mjøndalen on loan:

|-
|colspan="14"|Players who appeared for Mjøndalen no longer at the club:

|}

Goal scorers

Disciplinary record

References

Mjondalen
Mjøndalen IF Fotball seasons